This list is extracted from the Reptile Database.

Stub form in simple alphabetical order by scientific name.

References

 List, Kazakhstan
Kazakhstan
Reptiles
Kazakhstan